Mumin Aliyansyah (born July 15, 1989) is an Indonesian footballer who currently plays for Persija Jakarta in the Indonesia Super League.

References

External links

1989 births
Association football defenders
Living people
Indonesian footballers
Liga 1 (Indonesia) players
Indonesian Premier Division players
Persikabo Bogor players
Persija Jakarta players